Max Devrient (12 December 1857 – 14 June 1929) was a German-born stage and film actor. He worked at the Burgtheater in Vienna throughout his career, and in 1920 was made chief director. He was the son of the actor Karl August Devrient.

Selected filmography
 The Daughter of the Brigadier (1922)
 Sunken Worlds (1922)
 Money in the Streets (1922)
 Meriota the Dancer (1922)
 Confessions of a Monk (1922)

References

Bibliography
 William Grange. Historical Dictionary of German Theater. Rowman & Littlefield, 2015.

External links

1857 births
1929 deaths
German male stage actors
German male film actors
Actors from Hanover